The 2019 Rugby Africa Women's Cup was the first edition of the Rugby Africa Women's Cup and was held in South Africa. It also doubled as a 2021 Rugby World Cup qualifier for the African continent. The tournament was played as a single round-robin at the Bosman Stadium in Brakpan from 9–17 August 2019. Four women's national teams competed.

South Africa was undefeated in their three matches and won direct entry to the 2021 World Cup. Kenya advanced to the cross-regional repechage play-off against the South American winner.

Table

Match results

Round 1

Round 2

Round 3

References 

2019 in African rugby union
2019 in women's rugby union
Rugby Africa Women's Cup